Tympanocryptis wilsoni, the Roma earless dragon, is a species of agama found in Queensland, Australia.

References

wilsoni
Agamid lizards of Australia
Reptiles of Queensland
Endemic fauna of Australia
Taxa named by Jane Melville
Reptiles described in 2014